Duncan Phillips (26 June 1886 – 9 May 1966) was a Washington, D.C., based art collector and critic who played a seminal role in introducing modern art to America. The grandson of James Laughlin, a banker and co-founder of the Jones and Laughlin Steel Company, Phillips was born in Pittsburgh and moved with his family to Washington, D.C. in 1895.

Art collector and critic
Phillips, along with his mother, established the precursor of The Phillips Collection, The Phillips Memorial Gallery, after the sudden deaths of his father, Duncan Clinch Phillips (1838–1917), a Pittsburgh window glass millionaire and member of the South Fork Fishing and Hunting Club, and brother, James Laughlin Phillips (May 30, 1884 – 1918).

Beginning with a small family collection of paintings, Phillips, a published art critic, expanded the collection dramatically.  From the beginning Phillips conceived of his museum as "a memorial…a beneficent force in the community where I live—a joy-giving, life-enhancing influence, assisting people to see beautifully as true artists see."

Phillips married painter Marjorie Acker in 1921.  With her assistance and advice, Phillips developed his collection "as a museum of modern art and its sources," believing strongly in the continuum of artists influencing their successors through the centuries.  His focus on the continuous tradition of art was revolutionary at a time when America was largely critical of modernism, which was seen as a break with the past.  Phillips collected works by masters such as El Greco, calling him the "first impassioned expressionist"; Jean-Baptiste-Siméon Chardin because he was "the first modern painter"; Francisco Goya because he was "the stepping stone between the Old Masters and the Great Moderns like Cézanne"; and Édouard Manet, a "significant link in a chain which began with Goya and which [led] to Gauguin and Matisse."

From the 1920s to the 1960s, Phillips would re-hang his galleries in installations that were non-chronological and non-traditional, reflecting the relationships he saw between various artistic expressions.  He presented visual connections—between past and present, between classical form and romantic expression—as dialogues on the walls of the museum.  Giving equal focus to American and European artists, Phillips juxtaposed works by Winslow Homer, Thomas Eakins, Maurice Prendergast, James Abbott McNeill Whistler, and Albert Pinkham Ryder with canvases by Pierre Bonnard, Peter Ilsted and Édouard Vuillard.  He exhibited watercolors by John Marin with paintings by Cézanne, and works by van Gogh with El Greco’s The Repentant St. Peter (circa 1600–05).  Phillips’ vision brought together "congenial spirits among the artists," and his ideas still guide the museum today.

Throughout his lifetime, Phillips had the prescience and courage to acquire paintings by many artists who were not fully recognized at the time, among them Marin, Georgia O'Keeffe, Arthur Dove, Nicolas de Staël, Milton Avery and Augustus Vincent Tack.  By purchasing works by such promising but unknown artists, Phillips provided them with the means to continue painting.  He formed close bonds with and subsidized several artists who are prominently featured in the collection—Dove and Marin in particular—and consistently purchased works by artists and students for what he called his "encouragement collection."

A memorable Duncan Phillips anecdote has him standing with Dr. Albert C. Barnes, before the Renoir masterpiece "Luncheon of the Boating Party".  "That's the only Renoir you have, isn't it?" asked the fearsome Dr. Barnes, whose distinctive collection of Impressionist and post-Impressionist fine art contains scores of Renoirs and is now the Barnes Foundation in Philadelphia.  Phillips' reply was succinct: "It's the only one I need.”

When Duncan Phillips died on 9 May 1966, Marjorie succeeded him as museum director.  Their son, Laughlin, became director in 1972.  He led The Phillips Collection through a multi-year program to ensure the physical and financial security of the collection, renovate and enlarge the museum buildings, expand and professionalize the staff, conduct research on the collection, and make the Phillips more accessible to the public.

References

External links
 Biography (The Phillips Collection)

1886 births
1966 deaths
American art critics
American art collectors
Writers from Pittsburgh
People from Washington, D.C.
Journalists from Pennsylvania
20th-century American journalists
American male journalists
20th-century art collectors